Balfour may refer to:

People

Earls of Balfour
 Arthur James Balfour, 1st Earl of Balfour (1848–1930), British Conservative politician, Prime Minister of the UK (1902-1905), made the public statement of Balfour Declaration
 Gerald Balfour, 2nd Earl of Balfour (1853–1945), British Conservative politician
 Robert Balfour, 3rd Earl of Balfour (1902–1968)
 Gerald Arthur James Balfour, 4th Earl of Balfour (1925–2003)
 Roderick Balfour, 5th Earl of Balfour (born 1948)

Other people
 Balfour (surname), a Scottish family name
 Lord Balfour of Burleigh
 Baron Balfour of Glenawley
 Sir Graham Balfour (1858–1929), Victorian statistician and member of Florence Nightingale's inner circle
 Sir Isaac Bayley Balfour (1853–1922), a Scottish botanist and son of John Hutton Balfour
 John Hutton Balfour (1808–1884), a Scottish botanist and father of Sir Isaac Bayley Balfour

Places

Canada
 Balfour, British Columbia (aka Balfour Bay)
 Rayside-Balfour, Ontario
 Balfour Building

New Zealand
 Balfour, New Zealand
 Balfour River

Scotland
 Balfour, Aberdeenshire
 Balfour, Orkney
 Balfour Castle, Orkney

South Africa
 Balfour, Eastern Cape
 Balfour, Mpumalanga

Turks and Caicos Islands
 Balfour Town, Salt Cay, Turks Islands

United States
 Balfour, North Dakota
 Balfour, North Carolina

Other uses
 Beit Aghion, residence of the Israeli prime minister
 Gymnasia Balfour
 
 Balfour v. Balfour, English contract law case
 Balfour Beatty
 L.G. Balfour Company

See also

Balfour Declaration (disambiguation)